Bruno Rodriguez (born  25 November 1972) is a French former professional footballer who played as a forward.

Club career
Born in Bastia, Rodriguez spent his early career with Monaco B, Monaco, Bastia, Strasbourg, Metz and Paris Saint-Germain.

He joined newly promoted Bradford City in the English Premier League on a season-long loan from PSG in September 1999, for a loan fee of £500,000, but after making five appearances in all competitions, totalling 55 minutes of play, the loan was cancelled in October.

He later played for Lens, Guingamp, Rayo Vallecano, Ajaccio, Metz (again), and Clermont Foot.

After retiring he returned to Corsica, and was living in Bastia as of December 2016.

International career
Rodriguez was born in France to a Spanish father and Corsican mother. He was a France B international.

Personal life
In March 2022 the French players’ union UNFP confirmed that Rodriguez had undergone amputation of a leg due to chronic pain he had been suffering from since retirement from playing.

References

1972 births
Living people
Association football forwards
French footballers
French people of Spanish descent
French people of Corsican descent
AS Monaco FC players
SC Bastia players
RC Strasbourg Alsace players
FC Metz players
Paris Saint-Germain F.C. players
Bradford City A.F.C. players
RC Lens players
En Avant Guingamp players
Rayo Vallecano players
AC Ajaccio players
Clermont Foot players
Ligue 1 players
Ligue 2 players
Premier League players
La Liga players
French expatriate footballers
French expatriate sportspeople in England
Expatriate footballers in England
French expatriate sportspeople in Spain
Expatriate footballers in Spain
French expatriate sportspeople in Monaco